The following artists (musicians or bands) have had releases with Virgin Records.

#
 Thirty Seconds to Mars (Immortal/Virgin)
 The 69 Eyes
 311
 52nd Street

A
 Aaliyah (Blackground/Virgin)
 Paula Abdul
 Albin Lee Meldau
 Adelitas Way
 A Perfect Circle
 After 7
 Aftershock
 Air (French Band)
 Alice in Chains
 Alien
 Brooke Allison
 Marc Almond
 The Almost (Tooth and Nail)
 Altan
 Althea and Donna
 Amaral
 Amen
 American Music Club
 AM Taxi
 Amorphis
 Carleen Anderson
 And One
 Animal Logic
 Antique
 Tasmin Archer
 The Ark
 Atomic Kitten
 The Avant Gardener
 Kevin Ayers
 Avicii 
 Ayushita Nugraha (Virgin Jogjakarta)

B
 Joan Baez
 Balaam and the Angel
 Bandolero
 Tony Banks (outside US/Canada)
 Bastille
 BBB (Virgin/Mercury Jogjakarta)
 Victoria Beckham
 David Bedford
 Beenie Man
 The Big Dish
 Benjamin Biolay
 Thom Bishop
 Black Rebel Motorcycle Club
 Peter Blegvad
 Blind Guardian
 Blossoms
 Blue
 Blue Man Group
 The Blue Nile (Linn/Virgin)
 Blur (US only)
 Body Count
 Boxer
 David Bowie (US only)
 Boy George (More Protein/Virgin)
 Breathe
 Brother Cane
 Melanie Brown
 Bruce Boniface
 Bubba Sparxxx
 Emma Bunton

C
 Cabaret Voltaire
 Camper Van Beethoven
 Can
 Captain Beefheart
 Melanie C
 Chris Cagle (Virgin Nashville)
 Mariah Carey (Former)
 Belinda Carlisle (outside US & Canada until 1991, then worldwide in 1993)
 Cellophane
 The Chemical Brothers
 Che'Nelle
 Neneh Cherry
 China Crisis
 Chvrches
 Anne Clark
 Gilby Clarke
 College Boyz
 Phil Collins (UK and Ireland)
 Comateens
 The Constellations
 Nikka Costa
 Sagarika Mukherjee Da Costa
 Kevin Coyne
 Cracker
 The Cult
 Culture Club
 Curve
 Ivor Cutler
 Cutting Crew
 Holger Czukay
 Mark Curry

D
 Dave Gahan (US only)
 Deaf Pedestrians
 Déjà
 Deutsch Amerikanische Freundschaft
 Daft Punk (Former)
 Étienne Daho
 Roger Daltrey (10/Virgin) (outside US/Canada)
 Danny Wilson
 Clay Davidson (Virgin Nashville)
 D'Angelo
 Deadmau5
 Depeche Mode (Mute/Virgin) (US/France)
 Devo (UK/Europe only)
 Howard Devoto
 Divinyls
 Thomas Dolby (outside US/Canada)
 Does It Offend You, Yeah?
 Dreadzone
 dc Talk (ForeFront/Virgin)
 Hilary Duff (4Ever Hilary only in Italy) (via Hollywood Records)
 Stephen Tin Tin Duffy
 The Dukes of Stratosphear
 Dwele

E
 Eden xo (former)
 The Edge
 Efua
 Electronic (outside the US and Canada)
 Emily and the Strangers
 Endgames
 Enigma
 Eurythmics* (outside US/Australasia)
 Evanescence
 Everything but the Girl (except US & Canada)
 Every Little Thing (Japan)
 The Exies
 Ella Eyre
 Emeli Sandé (outside US)
 Ez Mil

F
 Ricky Fanté
 Perry Farrell
 Fat Joe
 Faust
 Bryan Ferry
 A Fine Frenzy
 Fingerprintz
 Fivespeed
 Florence + The Machine
 Tim Finn
 The Flying Lizards
 The Flying Pickets
 Julia Fordham
 Fountains of Wayne
 John Foxx
 Fra Lippo Lippi
 Peter Frampton
 Frazier Chorus

G

 Peter Gabriel (outside US & Canada)
 Gang Starr
 General Public
 Genesis (outside US & Canada)
 Max A. George
 The Geraldine Fibbers
 Gillan
 Ian Gillan
 The Golden Palominos (Germany only)
 Goldfrapp
 Goldrush
 Gong
 The Good, the Bad & the Queen
 Gorillaz (US only)
 Gorki
 Gravity Kills (Europe & Japan only)
 Loren Gray
 Great and Lady Soul
 Green River Ordinance
 Grizfolk
 David Guetta
 Guru

H
 Steve Hackett (outside US)
 Geri Halliwell
 Françoise Hardy
 Ben Harper
 Lalah Hathaway
 Hawkwind (Charisma; UK only)
 Heaven 17
 Håkan Hellström
 Henry Cow
 Lauran Hibberd
 Steve Hillage
 Holly and the Italians
 Robert Holmes
 The Human League
 HRVY

I
 Iggy Pop
 James Iha
 Ima Robot
 Immature
 Inner City
 Interview
 Mark Isham
 It Bites

J
 Janet Jackson
 The Japanese Popstars
 Joe Jackson
 Japan
 Jamie Scott
 Jamie T
 Jay Chou
 JBO
 Jesus Loves You
 Jin
 Johnny Hates Jazz
 Juliet

K
 Kavana
 Kavinsky
 Kelis
 Jerry Kilgore (Virgin Nashville)
 Killing Joke
 King Crimson
 King Swamp
 Frankie Knuckles
 Konirata
 The Kooks
 Korn
 k-os
 Lenny Kravitz

L
 Shona Laing
 The Last Goodnight
 Latin Alliance
 Ava Leigh
 Julian Lennon (except US & Canada)
 LCD Soundsystem
 Les Rita Mitsouko
 Le Toya
 Lewis Capaldi
 Lil' Eazy-E
 Linton Kwesi Johnson
 Courtney Love
 Loudhouse
 Cheryl Lynn
 Loren Gray
 Loose Ends

M
 Kirsty MacColl
 Rita MacNeil (Virgin Canada)
 Madness (outside the US & Canada)
 Madrugada
 Magazine
 Cheb Mami
 Manfred Mann's Earth Band 
 Mano Negra
 Manowar
 Lene Marlin
 Laura Marling
 Zeeteah Massiah
 Massive Attack
 Matia Bazar
 MC Skat Kat
 Malcolm McLaren
 Martha and the Muffins (Dinidisc/Virgin Canada)
 Holle Thee Maxwell
 Meat Loaf (outside US & Canada 1992–99; US & Canada 2007–10)
 Roy D. Mercer (Virgin Nashville)
 Miami Horror
 George Michael (outside US & Canada until 1999)
 Mick Karn
 Mickey 3D
 Mighty Diamonds
 Mike + The Mechanics (outside the US and Canada)
 Microdisney
 The Monochrome Set
 Gary Moore
 Moose (US only)
 The Motors
 Bob Mould
 The Music
 My Favorite Highway

N
 Jimmy Nail
 Nazareth (Mooncrest/Charisma; UK only)
 NCT/NCT 127
 N*E*R*D
 Tom Newman
 Newsboys
 Now That's What I Call Music! (compilation series)
 Michael Nyman

O
 Philip Oakey & Giorgio Moroder
 Liam O'Connor
 Mary Margaret O'Hara
 Mike Oldfield
 Lisa Ono (1997–2006)
 Oomph!
 Roy Orbison
 Orchestral Manoeuvres in the Dark
 Stacie Orrico
 The Other Ones
 Outside Edge

P
 The Pale Fountains
 Palladium
 Paris Angels
 Hope Partlow
 Penetration
 Amanda Perez
 Anthony Phillips
 Sam Phillips
 Billie Piper
 Placebo
 Pekka Pohjola
 Porcelain Black
 Tristan Prettyman
 Pretty Poison
 Professor Green
 Maxi Priest
 Public Image Ltd.
 Purple Ribbon All-Stars
 Pure Moods (compilation series)

Q
 Queen (Virgin EMI) (outside US/Canada)

R
 The Railway Children
 Rain Tree Crow
 Rascalz
 RBD
 Reamonn
 The Records
 Axelle Red
 The Red Jumpsuit Apparatus
 Julie Reeves (Virgin Nashville)
 Priscilla Renea (Capitol/Virgin joining)
 Richard Ashcroft
 Keith Richards
 Juliet Richardson
 Rip Rig + Panic
 Rise Against
 River Road (Virgin Nashville)
 The Rolling Stones
 Christy Carlson Romano
 Roxx Gang
 Roxy Music (E.G./Virgin)
 Röyksopp
 The Rutles
 The Ruts
 Ruth Lorenzo (2009–2010)
 Robbie Williams (2009–2010)

S
 Saosin
 Sacred Spirit
 Ryuichi Sakamoto
 Sandra
 Savage Progress
 Saving Abel
 Boz Scaggs
 Scarlett and Black
 Jon Secada
 September Mourning
 The Sex Pistols
 Shaan
 Shaggy (Former)
 Shane Harper
 Shapeshifters
 Sharissa
 Feargal Sharkey
 SheSays
 SHINee (Japan)
 Shonen Knife (North America/France)
 Shooting Star
 Sick Puppies
 Simple Minds
 Six
 Skunk Anansie
 Slapp Happy
 The Smashing Pumpkins (Hut [outside North America]/Virgin)
 Elliott Smith
 Sneaker Pimps
 Snow
 Something Happens
 Soul II Soul
 Source Direct
 Sparks
 Spice Girls
 Stacie Orrico
 Stardust
 The Starting Line
 Jermaine Stewart
 Joss Stone
 The Stone Roses
 Syd Straw
 Suicidal Tendencies
 Swedish House Mafia (former)
 Switched
 David Sylvian and Robert Fripp

T
 The Vamps
 The Wallflowers
 The Table
 Tangerine Dream
 Terror Squad (Terror Squad/Imperial/Virgin)
 Thalía
 That Petrol Emotion
 The Thrills
 Yann Tiersen
 Tin Tin Out
 Pete Townshend
 T'Pau (Siren/Virgin)
 Traffic
 Trina
 Trypes
 KT Tunstall (Relentless/Virgin)
 Turbonegro
 Tina Turner (US only)

U
 UB40 (DEP International/Virgin)
 Unbelievable Truth
 Underoath (UK)
 Hikaru Utada (Japan; 1998–2005)

V
 Brooke Valentine
 Velcra
 The Verve
 Angela Via
 Vicky Shu (Virgin Jogjakarta)

W
 Rick Wakeman (Charisma/Virgin)
 Scott Walker
 Warrior
 Delroy Washington
 We Are Scientists
 Brandi Wells (UK only)
 Wendy & Lisa
 Whale
 When in Rome
 The Who
 Wigwam
 Steve Winwood
 Roger Wootton
 Working Week
 Link Wray
 Robert Wyatt

X
 XTC
 Xylina Spathia

Y
 Yanni
 You Am I
 You Me At Six
 Sydney Youngblood
 Yellowman

Z
 Warren Zevon

References

Lists of recording artists by label